Billups House, also known as Milford, is a historic home located near Moon, Mathews County, Virginia. It was built between about 1770 and 1790, and is a -story, three bay, frame dwelling set upon a low brick basement.  It has a gable roof with dormers and interior end chimneys.  The interior has a central-passage, double-pile Georgian plan.

It was listed on the National Register of Historic Places in 1980.

The home was owned by Billups descendants until 2013.

References

Houses on the National Register of Historic Places in Virginia
Houses completed in 1790
Houses in Mathews County, Virginia
National Register of Historic Places in Mathews County, Virginia